Ian McCall may refer to:

Ian McCall (fighter) (born 1984), mixed martial artist in the Ultimate Fighting Championship
Ian McCall (footballer) (born 1964), Scottish football player and manager